Metzia longinasus is a species of cyprinid in the genus Metzia.

References

Cyprinidae
Cyprinid fish of Asia
Freshwater fish of China